Ahmet Fikri Tüzer (1878, Şumnu, Ottoman Empire, today Shumen in Bulgaria – 16 August 1942, Ankara) was a Turkish politician, who was a member of the Republican People's Party and the acting Prime Minister of the Republic of Turkey for two days from 7 July 1942 to 9 July 1942 (during the 12th government of Turkey). He was also the Minister of the Interior from 6 May 1942 to 16 August 1942.

Notes

References
 Prime Ministry of Turkey - Members of the 12th Government of Turkey

1878 births
1942 deaths
20th-century prime ministers of Turkey
Government ministers of Turkey
Members of the 12th government of Turkey
People from Shumen
Republican People's Party (Turkey) politicians
Ministers of the Interior of Turkey
Members of the 13th government of Turkey
Bulgarian Turks in Turkey